The Passage of Love is a 2017 novel by the Australian author Alex Miller. Michael Cathcart, when interviewing Alex Miller on ABC Radio, described The Passage of Love as 'The most candid, sharing, generous book I've read in a long, long time.'

Reviews
 "The Real Truth in Novels", Jason Steger, The Sydney Morning Herald, 4 November 2017.
 Kirkus Reviews, 'A rich addition to the growing shelf of autofiction from a seasoned storyteller', June 18, 2018. 
 Bridget Delaney, 'Alex Miller evokes lost Melbourne and past loves in 'private and personal' novel', The Guardian, 13 Dec 2017.

References 

2017 Australian novels
Novels by Alex Miller
Novels set in Melbourne
Allen & Unwin books